Bibhas is a Hindustani classical raga.

Theory 
Bibhas (sometimes also called 'Vibhas') is a pentatonic raga belonging to the Bhairav Thaat. This Raga is sung during daybreak. It is quite similar to Raga Deshkar as changing the Shuddha Dha and Shuddha Re of Deshkar converts it into Bibhas. The true nature of Bibhas has  and  flat. However, it is very rarely performed using the Shuddha Dha. In order to maintain the pure character of Bibhas, it is very important that Pa is not the last note during any alap or taan.
The atmosphere created by this raga is serious, as it has Komal '' and ''.

Arohana and avarohana 
Arohana: S r G P d S'

Avarohana: S' d P G r S

Thaat 
Bhairav Thaat

Vadi and samavadi 
 &

Pakad or Chalan 
r* G r* G, P d* S', d* P G r* S.

Organization and relationships 
Related ragas: Rewa, Jait

Behavior 
Behavior refers to practical aspects of the music. It is complicated to talk about this for Hindustani music since many of the concepts are fluid, changing, or archaic. The following information cannot be accurate, but it can attempt to reflect how the music existed.

Samay (time) 
Bibhas is sung at daybreak.

Important recordings 
Bhibaas was once sung in the Sangeet Varsha, which occurred on June 7, 2015, hosted by Svara Sangam. This raag has been sung by many masters, to name a few, Pt. Jitendra Abhisheki, Pt. Mallikarjun Mansur and Vidhushi Kishori Amonkar.

Film songs

Language:Tamil

References 

 Bor, Joep (ed). Rao, Suvarnalata; der Meer, Wim van; Harvey, Jane (co-authors) The Raga Guide: A Survey of 74 Hindustani Ragas. Zenith Media, London: 1999.

External links 
 SRA on Samay and Ragas
 SRA on Ragas and Thaats
 Rajan Parrikar on Ragas

Hindustani ragas